Hotel Tycoon Resort is a business simulation game created and developed by German studio Claw Design Software, published 2010 by eFUSION X.

Game storyline 
The protagonist is in love with the beautiful daughter of a successful but rigorous hotel magnate. He won't allow them to be together unless the player proves worthy and can show that he is able to manage the  big hotel business.

Reception
Hotel Tycoon Resort was rated 8.5 out of 10 by Gamemobile  and 6.0 out of 11 (0-10) by Pocketgamer.
It is currently the second most popular paid game on BlackBerry AppWorld.

References

External links

Reviews
 Mobile Gamer Review
 Berryfication Review

2010 video games
Business simulation games
J2ME games
Java platform games
Mobile games
Video games developed in Germany
Video games set in hotels